Hanns Horst Heise (1 February 1913 – 18 May 1992) was a highly decorated Oberstleutnant in the Luftwaffe during World War II, and a recipient of the Knight's Cross of the Iron Cross. The Knight's Cross of the Iron Cross was awarded to recognise extreme battlefield bravery or successful military leadership.

Awards and decorations
 Aviator badge
 Front Flying Clasp of the Luftwaffe 
 Ehrenpokal der Luftwaffe (15 September 1941)
 Iron Cross (1939)
 2nd Class 
 1st Class 
 German Cross in Gold (13 January 1942)
 Knight's Cross of the Iron Cross on 3 September 1942 as Hauptmann and Gruppenkommandeur of the IV./Kampfgeschwader 76
 Legion of Merit 1971

References

Citations

Bibliography

 
 
 

1913 births
1992 deaths
People from Treuenbrietzen
Luftwaffe pilots
German World War II pilots
Bundeswehr generals
Brigadier generals of the German Air Force
Recipients of the Gold German Cross
Recipients of the Knight's Cross of the Iron Cross
German prisoners of war in World War II
People from the Province of Brandenburg
Officers Crosses of the Order of Merit of the Federal Republic of Germany
Military personnel from Brandenburg